State Highway 32 (SH 32) is a New Zealand state highway in the Central North Island.

Route description
The route begins at SH 1 in Tokoroa and travels west along Maraetai Road, leaving Tokoroa where the road angles in a more southerly direction through the Kinleith Forest. It eventually meets  at a three way junction. Shortly after reaching the locality of Whakamaru, SH 32 leaves the concurrency and continues south. From there, motorists can continue eastbound to reach SH 1 and complete the alternative north–south route.

Major intersections

History
SH 32, when first established, consisted of only the  section between SH 30 and SH 41. In 1995, the highway was extended to Tokoroa. For many years it was the longest highway not to have a major junction with any of the single digit state highways.

See also
 List of New Zealand state highways

References

External links
 New Zealand Transport Agency

32
Transport in Waikato